Olavi Hirvonen (born December 26, 1930) is an American cross-country skier. He competed in the men's 15 kilometre event at the 1960 Winter Olympics.

References

External links
 

1930 births
Living people
American male cross-country skiers
Olympic cross-country skiers of the United States
Cross-country skiers at the 1960 Winter Olympics
Skiers from Montreal